The Somonița is a left tributary of the river Mureș in Romania. It discharges into the Mureș in Valea Mare.

References

Rivers of Romania
Rivers of Timiș County
Rivers of Arad County